Kramers FC is a Palauan association football club from Koror which plays in the Palau Soccer League, the top level league in Palau in the Spring League 2012. It was founded in at least 2008.

History
Kramers FC finished first in their first season of competition for which data is available in the 2008 Palau Soccer League. Their next recorded season of football is 2012, where they finished third in the Spring League and currently fifth and last in the Fall League as of November 2012.,

Honors
Palau Soccer League: 1
2008

Players

2012 Squad

References

Football clubs in Palau
2004 establishments in Palau
Association football clubs established in 2004